St Mewan was an electoral division of Cornwall in the United Kingdom which returned one member to sit on Cornwall Council from 2009 to 2021. The seat was vacant from February 2020 to May 2021, after the Conservative councillor Cherilyn Mackrory (née Williams) was elected as MP for Truro and Falmouth in the 2019 general election. The coronavirus pandemic meant that a by-election could not be held and so the seat remained vacant until it was abolished at the 2021 local elections, being replaced by St Mewan and Grampound.

Councillors

Extent
St Mewan represented the villages of St Ewe, Sticker, Polgooth, St Mewan, Trewoon and the hamlets of Polmassick, Kestle, Hewas Water, Trelowth. Although the division was nominally abolished during boundary changes at the 2013 elections, this had little effect on the ward. Both before and after boundary changes, the division covered 3,319 hectares in total.

Election results

2017 election

2013 election

2009 election

References

Electoral divisions of Cornwall Council